Established in 2013, Minnesota United FC Reserves were an American professional soccer club based in Woodbury, Minnesota who played in the Premier League of America. The team served as a development squad for their parent club, Minnesota United FC, then member of the North American Soccer League.

Mission 
Upon the establishment of the Reserve team in 2013, the head coach of the Minnesota United FC main team, Manny Lagos, clearly stressed that the primary mission of forming the new team would be building a stronger foundation for and raising competitiveness within the first team: "We want to continue to grow the vision of what the club can be. Having a Reserve team is a big piece of developing potential local players but also keep the first team competitive. When you have something like this it can grow into a lot of different areas but it’s really about building this club the right way so we can be strong and have a great culture for the future," Manny said.

Season-by-season

Rivalries 
In the NPSL the Twin Cities Derby was contested between Minnesota United FC Reserves (based in Woodbury) and Minnesota Twin Stars (based in Minnetrista). After moving to the PLA the derby continues between the Reserves and Minneapolis City SC (based in Minneapolis).

Current roster 

Note: Flags indicate national team as defined under FIFA eligibility rules. Players may hold more than one non-FIFA nationality.

Staff  
  Andy Seidel – Head Coach
  Chris Brisson – Assistant Coach

References

External links
Official team site
@MNUFCReserves
Bielenberg Sports Center
NPSL Website: Minnesota United FC Reserves Profile
The Loon Call (Fan website): Reserves

 
Soccer clubs in Minneapolis–Saint Paul
Soccer clubs in Minnesota
Association football clubs established in 2013
National Premier Soccer League teams
2013 establishments in Minnesota
Reserve soccer teams in the United States